General elections were held in the British Virgin Islands on 11 November 1983.  The result was a victory for the opposition United Party in coalition with independent candidate Cyril Romney over the governing Virgin Islands Party (VIP) led by former Chief Minister Lavity Stoutt.  Each major party won four seats, and Cyril Romney was the sole remaining elected independent.  Accordingly, Romney allegedly agree to join a coalition with whichever party would make him Chief Minister.  The VIP declined to do so, but the UP eventually agreed thereby winning the election despite securing a smaller overall percentage of the vote.

Janice George served as the supervisor of elections.  Turnout averaged 73.1% across the six districts that voted; the 1st District had the highest turnout (83.5%) and the 3rd District had the lowest (67.8%).

1983 was the second election after the Legislative Council had been expanded from seven district seats to nine.  Astonishingly, just like the previous election, fully one third of the seats up for election were not contested, with only a single candidate standing in the 7th, 8th and 9th Districts.  For the 7th and 8th Districts, this was the second consecutive general election when those seats went uncontested.

The election is also notable in that every single person who would ever serve as Chief Minister of the British Virgin Islands (excluding Premiers) (Stoutt, Wheatley, Romney and O'Neal) was elected during the 1983 general election.

Notable candidates who were elected for the first time included future Leader of the Opposition, E. Walwyn Brewley.

Results

By constituency

Footnotes

Elections in the British Virgin Islands
British Virgin
General election
British Virgin
November 1983 events in North America